Demo Vault Vol. 1 is a compilation album by Celldweller, which consists of demos released through Klayton's weekly YouTube series, "Demo Vault", which has been active since February 2014. It was released on May 30, 2014, and contains all demos released up to that point, including three Wish Upon a Blackstar outtakes.

Track listing
All songs written by Klayton.

References

2014 compilation albums
Celldweller albums